Armor Attack is multidirectional shooter designed by Tim Skelly and released in arcades by Cinematronics in 1980. It was licensed to Sega in Japan. The vector graphics of Armor Attack present combat between the player's jeep and enemy vehicles in an overhead, maze-like view of a town. The buildings are not drawn in the game, but are an overlay that sits on top of the monitor. The overlay also tints the vectors green.

Armor Attack was released for the Vectrex in 1982.

Gameplay

One button rotates the jeep clockwise, while a second button rotates counterclockwise. A third button simulates the gas pedal and moves the jeep forward. A fourth button is used for firing a rocket launcher that shoots straight ahead. The player can have two rockets in the air at a time. 

Tanks periodically spawn from different locations on the edge of the screen and drive towards the player. The tanks always travel along horizontal or vertical lines, unlike the freely moving jeep. Tank turrets move to track the player, allowing them to shoot in any direction. Tanks normally take two hits to kill, and the player can have only two rockets on the screen at a time. The helicopter spawns from any point, and approaches the player in looping paths flying over the jeep and periodically firing. If hit, the helicopter spirals in. Destroying the helicopter rewards the player with an extra life.

The player can be killed by being shot by either the tanks or helicopter, or by colliding with the tanks. In two-player mode, the players can not kill each other. Gameplay periodically speeds up to increase the difficulty.

Reception
David H. Ahl of Creative Computing Video & Arcade Games praised the  "amazing realism" of the enemy helicopter in the Vectrex version.

References

External links

Armor Attack at Arcade History

1980 video games
Arcade video games
Cinematronics games
Multidirectional shooters
Multiplayer and single-player video games
Vector arcade video games
Vectrex games
Video games developed in the United States